The 8th National Assembly of the Republic of Slovenia was elected in the 3 June 2018 Slovenian parliamentary elections. At the order of President Borut Pahor, it first convened on 22 June 2018. The assembly was in session during the outgoing 12th Government of Prime Minister Miro Cerar and was expected to elect the 13th government. It is the fourth consecutive assembly in which centre-left and left-wing parties have a majority.

Major events 
 June 22, 2018: 1st session (convened by President Borut Pahor)
 Matej Tonin (NSi) was elected Speaker with 80 out of 90 votes.
 August 17, 2018: Election of Prime Minister Marjan Šarec (LMŠ)
 August 23, 2018: Election of Speaker Dejan Židan (SD) and Deputy-Speaker Tina Heferle (LMŠ) and Jože Tanko (SDS)
 September 13, 2018: Election of 13th Government of the Republic of Slovenia
January 27, 2020: Prime Minister Marjan Šarec resigned.
March 3, 2020: Election of Prime Minister Janez Janša (SDS) and resignation of Speaker Dejan Židan (SD)
March 5, 2020: Election of Speaker Igor Zorčič (then SMC)
March 13, 2020: Election of 14th Government of the Republic of Slovenia

Major legislation 

* retroactive law

Political parties

Leadership

National Assembly leadership

Leaders of the political groups

Members

Demographics 
8th National Assembly has 22 female MPs which equals 24,4 %, and is a little bit less than in the 7th Assembly. Youngest MP is Jerca Korče (LMŠ) who is 28 years old. Oldest MP is Jožef Česnik (SAB), who is 73 years old and also presided over the first session.

Changes in membership

Changes of MPs 
Changes are expected when government will be formed, MP who is named Prime Minister, Minister, State Secretary or Secretary-General of the government, cannot be MP anymore and is replaced with an MP that would be elected, if they were not elected. Peter Jožef Česnik and Miro Cerar, ministers of the 13th Government, resigned as MPs and will not take their seats after new government will be elected.

Changes in the political groups membership

Working bodies

Committiees

Former Committees

Standing Commissions

Supervisory Commissions 
In supervisory commissions opposition has majority.

Inquiry Commissions

Other bodies

Sessions

Sessions of the Assembly

Appointments 
For full list of appointments and nominations see Appointments by the 8th National Assembly of the Republic of Slovenia.

Elections

Motions for removal 
Motion for removal can be submitted by the same proposer who proposed designee's election and it is decided about removal by the same procedure that was needed for the election.

Composition of the executive 

 President of the Republic: Borut Pahor (SD), from 22 December 2012
 Government:
12th Government (18 September 2014 – 13 September 2018)
Prime Minister: Miro Cerar (SMC)
13th Government (13 September 2018 – 13 March 2020)
Prime Minister: Marjan Šarec (LMŠ)
14th Government (3 March 2020 – )
Prime Minister: Janez Janša (SDS)

Interpellations, votes of confidence, and impeachement

Interpellations 
According to the Article 118 of the Constitution at least 10 MPs can submit and interpelation against a minister or government as a whole.

Votes of confidence 
Prime Minister can, according to the Article 117 of the Constitution request a vote of confidence. If government does not win the vote of confidence, National Assembly has to elect new Prime Minister within 30 days. If it fails, President of the Republic dissolves the National Assembly and snap election takes place within 60 days.

Also, according to the Article 116 of the Constitution, 10 MPs can propose a vote of no confidence and at the same time propose a candidate for the new Prime Minister.

Impeachment 
Based on Articles 109 and 119 of the Constitution National Assembly may impeach President of the Republic, Prime Minister or ministers before the Constitutional Court if they violate the Constitution or laws.

Legislative services heads 
 Secretary-General: Uršula Zore Tavčar
 Head of the Secretariat and Deputy Secretary-General: Jerneja Bergoč
 Head of29 the Sector for the activities of the National Assembly: Mojca Marn Čepuran
 Head of the Department for preparation of sessions of the National Assembly and working bodies:
 Head of the Department for international activity, protocol and translation: Tatjana Pandev
 Head of the Research and documentation sector: Tatjana Krašovec
 Head of the Research department: Igor Zobavnik
 Head of the Documentation and Library Department: Vojka Vuk Dirnbek
 Director and Deputy Secretary-General: Igor Ivančič
 Head of the General sector: Anita Longo
 Head of the Department of Organization and Staff: Sonja Nahtigal
 Head of the Financial department: Rok Tomšič
 Head of the Information sector:
 Head of the Information Systems Development Department: Bojan Verbič
 Head of the Department for work with materials and mail: Gordana Černe
 Head of the Department of Operations Service: Jela Jelič
 Head of the Department for printing: Iztok Potočnik
 Head of the Operational-technical sector: Alenka Urbančič
 Head of the Investment and Maintenance Department: Janez Gomboc
 Head of the Catering Department: Verica Novaković
 Head of the Department of Transportation: Ivo Paal
 Head of the Department for Reception and Telephones: Anita Knez
 Services of the political groups
 Expert assistance for the political groups
 Head of the Office of the President: Katarina Ratoša
 Head of the Legal Service: Nataša Voršič
 Head of the Public Relations Office: Karmen Uglešič
 Permanent Representative of the National Assembly to the European Parliament: Zvone Bergant

International activity

International activity of the Speaker

Delegations

Friendship groups

Other

Zmago Jelinčič Plemeniti (SNS) corruption allegations 
It was reported on 29 June 2018 that Parliamentary Assembly of the Council of Europe's (PACE) special independent investigative body issued its report on so called Caviar diplomacy by Azerbaijan. Zmago Jelinčič Plemeniti (SNS), who returned in the National Assembly after 7 years in the last election, was banned from entering Council of Europe due to severe violation of the PACE's rules. Jelinčič was accused of receiving €25,000  for voting against the report of the PACE stating that irregularities occurred during elections in Azerbaijan, which he observed. Jelinčič declined accusations and stated that he received money to translate Tone Svetina's novel Ukana into Russian language, however translation of the book is nowhere to be found, reported Slovenian media. Jelinčič was named Vice-President of the Committee on Foreign Policy on 3 July 2018. However The Left, which also supported the resolution, with which leaders of the committees were named, stated that their support was a mistake. Other parties, SDS, LMŠ and SAB stated that current leaders of the committees are only temporary and that new leaders will be named after coalition is formed and all the committees founded. Some, including GRECO and TI, also called on the National Assembly to finally form and pass an Ethical Code for MPs. Slovenian Commission for the prevention of corruption announced that it will investigate the case.

Milan Brglez (SMC) expulsion from the party 
Milan Brglez was soon after the election, on 26 June 2018 expelled from the party. Reason for that was his self-candidature for Speaker of the National Assembly, since Miro Cerar did not have support of potential coalition partners (LMŠ, SD, NSi, SAB and DeSUS) to become Speaker himself. Executive committee also blamed Brglez that he did not respect decision of the parties and has been making statements that were opposite to the statements of Cerar and other party officials. As example they added that Cerar supported US missile strikes against Syria earlier in April and Brglez did not and stated that these acts are against international law and Slovenian Constitution. He decided to stay member of the SMC group in the Assembly, but did not rule out the possibility to join another group later, most possibly The Left.

Zdravko Počivalšek (SMC) lobbying affair 
On 2 August 2018 Commission for the prevention of corruption issued its report on Zdravko Počivalšek's unlawful meetings with former President of Executive Council of SRS (Prime Minister) and former Director of State Security Service (SDV) Janez Zemljarič who is seen as one of the most important people in Slovenia as a part of so-called "Deep State". Počivalšek tried to prevent the publishing of the report, however Supreme Court decided that contents of their meetings can be publicly announced. Meetings were against the law because Počivašek as public servant did not report them to the Commission and because Zemljarič is not registered as lobbyst or representative of any company, but was however acting in such way. Meetings were made public by Reporter's journalist in 2016. Zemljarič and Počivalšek were talking about construction of Izolski otok (Izola Island) project worth around half billion euros. It is reported that State Secretary Eva Štravs Podlogar (SD) met with Zemljarič as well.

Zmago Jelinčič Plemeniti (SNS) appropriation of books 
During 2008–2011 term of the 5th National Assembly political group of Slovenian National Party ordered books using National Assembly funds. Books should have been returned to the National Assembly Library after

During the 2008–2011 term of the 5th National Assembly, the political group of the Slovenian National Party commissioned books worth more than €10,000 through the National Assembly. At the end of the mandate, the books should have been returned to the National Assembly's Library, which had not been doneby the political group which referred to the fact that the books belong to the political group. Subsequently, the Public Prosecutor's Office filed a lawsuit against Zmago Jelinčič, which failed because the prosecutor's office should sue the political group and not Jelinčič. The state originally obtained the judgment and recovered €10,000 from Jelinčič, but the money had to be returned after Jelinčič's appeal and the nullification of the verdict.

Constitutional problems

Incompatibility of functions 
Prime Minister Miro Cerar (SMC) and ministers Dejan Židan (SD) and Zdravko Počivalšek (SMC) have been elected MPs at the last elections. This causes constitutional problems since according to the Constitution Prime Minister or minister cannot be MP at the same time. Since Constitution also states that all members of the government have to execute their power until new government is elected they still are members of the government. This has however happened before, but it has never taken so long to officially form new coalition and elect new government after elections. Also currently Slovenia has some important questions opened, most importantly – selling NLB bank according to the 2013 agreement with European Commission, because of which government submits many bills to the National Assembly. And because Cerar, Židan and Počivalšek are also MPs they vote on bills that their government submitted to the Assembly.

Nullification of the elections 
Former SD MP and Speaker Janko Veber, Vili Kovačič, Gašper Ferjan, Andreja Magajna (former SD MP) and Jožef Jarh filed an appeal against 3 June elections results and requested that Supreme Court annules elections. Following Supreme Court's rejection they filed an apply to the Constitutional Court who rejected them as well. They claimed laws regulating elections are unconstitutional.

Elections of the Speaker with no deputy-speaker elected 
On 6 August Marjan Šarec announced that five parties gathered around LMŠ (including SMC, SD, DeSUS and SAB) will propose a candidate for the new Speaker – Dejan Židan (SD). However Legal Service of the National Assembly explained that new Speaker cannot be elected before at least one Deputy-Speaker is elected first, which would become Acting-Speaker when current Speaker Matej Tonin would resign, following forming a new coalition.

Majority in the supervisory commissions 
Another problem might occur with memberships of the standing supervisory commissions. It is the first time in the history that Slovenia will have minority government, and majority in the commissions must have parties in the opposition. Since The Left will support the government and still be formally in the opposition it could happen that the government might have ensured majority in the commissions with votes from The Left.

Šarec Government – minority or majority government? 
Some of the constitutional lawyers, including former Judge of the Constitutional Court and former MP, now Full Professor Ciril Ribičič, questioned the status of the potential Government of Marjan Šarec. Many of them agree that it will be in fact majority government, since Prime Minister will be elected in the second round, where still 46 votes are needed for the election (absolute majority). Although The Left will not nominate ministers in the Government, they are still seen as a coalition party, meaning that new government in fact has majority in the parliament.

Results of the parliamentary elections

Elections of the representatives of national minorities

Italian national minority

Hungarian national minority

References 

2018 in Slovenia
Slovenian politicians
National Assembly (Slovenia)
8th National Assembly (Slovenia)